Sumela Monastery (Moní Panagías Soumelá;) is a Greek Orthodox monastery dedicated to the Theotokos  located at Karadağ (Greek: Sou Melá, meaning "Black Mountain") within the Pontic Mountains, in the Maçka district of Trabzon Province in modern Turkey.

Nestled in a steep cliff at an altitude of about  facing the Altındere valley, it is a site of great historical and cultural significance, as well as a major tourist attraction within Altındere National Park. Due to an increase in rock falls, on 22 September 2015 the monastery was closed to the public for safety reasons for the duration of one year to resolve the problem; this was later extended to three years. It reopened to tourists 25 May 2019. The monastery is one of the most important historic and touristic venues in Trabzon.

Etymology
Soumela comes from the Greek 'Sou Melá', meaning "of black (mountain)" (as in the dark/black mountain).

According to another etymological theory regarding the origin of the monastery's name, it comes from the Laz word სუმელა [sumela], which means "Trinity" in English.

History
It is not known when the monastery was founded, but the Turkish Ministry of Culture and Tourism places the date around AD 386, during the reign of the emperor Theodosius I (375–395). According to William Miller, two Athenian monks named Barnabas and Sophronios founded the monastery. It became famous for an icon of the Theotokos known as the Panagia Gorgoepekoos, said to have been painted by the Apostle Luke.

During its long history, the monastery fell into ruin several times and was restored by various emperors. During the 6th century, it was restored and enlarged by the Byzantine general Belisarius at the behest of emperor Justinian.

It reached its present form in the 13th century after gaining prominence during the existence of the Empire of Trebizond. While the emperors Basil and John II had endowed the monastery richly, it was during the reign of Alexios III (1349–1390) that Sumela received its most important largess: according to legend, the young Alexios was saved from a storm by the Theotokos, and was bidden by her to restore the monastery. A chrysobull dated to 1365 confirms the freedom and autonomy of the monastery, together with all of its hereditary lands and dependents; exempts them from all taxes, except for one biannual tax; and restores to it the serfs whom the tax-collectors of Matzouka had illegally taken from it, listing 40 of the serfs by name. At that time, the monastery was granted an amount annually from imperial funds. During the time of Manuel III, son of Alexios III, and during the reigns of subsequent princes, Sumela gained further wealth from imperial grants.

Following the conquest by the Ottoman Sultan Mehmed II in 1461, it was granted the sultan's protection and given rights and privileges that were renewed by following sultans. The monastery remained a popular destination for monks and travelers through the years.

In 1682 and for the following decades, the monastery housed the Phrontisterion of Trapezous, a well-known Greek educational institution of the region.

Modern period
Until the Russian occupation of Trabzon (1916–1918), the Sumela Monastery was active and was visited by monks and Christian and Muslim pilgrimages. In 1923, the Ottoman Empire collapsed and after the National War of Liberation, an independent Turkish Republic was founded by Ataturk. After 1923, the Sumela Monastery was abandoned following the population exchange between Greece and Turkey as laid down in the Treaty of Lausanne. In 1930, those who migrated founded a new monastery which they named as the new Panagia Sumela Monastery on the slopes of Mount Vermion, near the town of Naousa, in Macedonia, Greece. Some treasures from the old Sumela Monastery were carried to the new one in Greece.

In 1930, the wooden parts of the Sumela Monastery were destroyed by fire and in the years following other parts of the monastery were damaged and pillaged by treasure hunters.

Today, the Sumela Monastery is a museum open to visitors. Restoration work is funded by the Government of Turkey. As of 2012, the Turkish government is funding reconstruction work, and the monastery is enjoying a revival in pilgrimage from Greece, Georgia and Russia. The monastery's primary function is as a tourist attraction. It overlooks forests and streams, making it popular for its aesthetics as well as its cultural and religious significance.

On 15 August 2010, Orthodox divine liturgy was allowed to take place in the monastery compound.  A special pass issued by the Ecumenical Patriarchate of Constantinople is required to visit on August 15, the day of the Dormition of the Theotokos or Feast of the Assumption, when a divine liturgy is held. Only 450 to 500 visitors are allowed inside the monastery, although widescreen televisions are available to observe the event at a nearby cafe.

On 22 September 2015, the Monastery was closed to visitors for three years due to necessary restoration and field work. It reopened on May 18, 2019.

In 2022, video footage showed modern music and dancing at the site. Amid outcry on the internet that the historic monastery was turned into a dance club, an explanation was given that this was done to promote tourism.

Construction and buildings
The principal elements of the Monastery complex are the Rock Church, several chapels, kitchens, student rooms, a guesthouse, a library, and a sacred spring revered by Eastern Orthodox Christians.

The large aqueduct at the entrance, which supplied water to the Monastery, is constructed against the side of the cliff. The aqueduct has many arches which have mostly been restored. The entrance to the Monastery leads up a long and narrow stairway. There is a guard-room next to the entrance. The stairs lead down from there to the inner courtyard. On the left, in front of a cave, there are several monastery buildings. The cave, which was converted into a church, constitutes the center of the monastery. The library is to the right.

The large building with a balcony on the front part of the cliff was used for the monks' cells and for housing guests. It dates from 1840.

The inner and outer walls of the Rock Church and the walls of the adjacent chapel are decorated with frescoes. Frescoes dating from the era of Alexios III of Trebizond line the inner wall of the Rock Church facing the courtyard.  The frescoes of the chapel which were painted on three levels in three different periods are dated to the beginning of the 18th century. The frescoes of the bottom band are of superior quality.

The frescoes of the monastery are seriously damaged due to vandalism. The main subject of the frescoes are biblical scenes telling the story of Jesus and the Virgin Mary.

During the 2015–2017 restoration works, a secret tunnel was discovered which lead to a place which is believed to have served as a temple or chapel for Christians. Also, unseen frescoes were discovered depicting heaven and hell as well as life and death.

Gallery

See also
Hagia Sophia, Trabzon
Mokissos

References

External links

Turkish Government's website
The History of the icon of Panagia Soumela

VR Photography Inside of Panagia Soumela
Greek Orthodox Liturgy in Turkey: Uncovering the Country's Non-Muslim Cultural Heritage
Photos of Sumela Monastery
Photographic survey of Sumela Monastery

Greek Orthodox monasteries in Turkey
Byzantine architecture in Trabzon
Archaeological sites in the Black Sea Region
Museums in Trabzon Province
Empire of Trebizond
386
Christian monasteries established in the 4th century
Buildings and structures in Trabzon Province
Religious museums in Turkey
Landmarks in Turkey
Ruined churches in Turkey
World Heritage Tentative List for Turkey
380s establishments in the Byzantine Empire
Byzantine monasteries in Turkey
Pontic Greek culture
Cliff dwellings